Edward Denis (also Dionysius) Kelly (December 30, 1860 – March 26, 1926) was an American prelate of the Roman Catholic Church.  He served as the first auxiliary bishop of the Diocese of Detroit in Michigan from 1911 to 1919, and then as the third bishop of the Diocese of Grand Rapids in Michigan from 1919 until his death in 1926.

Biography

Early life 
Edward Kelly was born on December 30, 1860, in Hartford, Michigan, to Thomas and Mary (née Hannon) Kelly. He attended Assumption College in Windsor, Ontario,  Mount St. Mary's Seminary in Cincinnati, Ohio, and St. Charles College in Catonsville, Maryland. Kelly finished his formation for the priesthood at St. Joseph's Seminary in Troy, New York.

Priesthood 
Kelly was ordained to the priesthood for the Diocese of Detroit in Windsor on June 16, 1886 by Bishop Caspar Borgess.  After his ordination, Kelly was appointed as assistant pastor at St. Philip's Parish in Battle Creek, Michigan. In late 1887, he also joined the faculty of St. Francis Seminary in Monroe, Michigan;  he was named as vice rector two years later.  Also in 1889, he was moved to pastoral positions first at St. John's Parish in Monroe and then to St. Joseph's Parish in Dexter, Michigan.

Kelly was named as an examiner for the diocese in 1891, a post he would hold until 1919.  He was also named pastor of St. Thomas the Apostle Catholic Parish in Ann Arbor, Michigan.  While there, he constructed a larger church between 1896 and 1899, using the architectural firm Spier & Rohns.

Auxiliary Bishop of Detroit 
On December 9, 1910, Pope Pius X appointed Kelly as the first auxiliary bishop of the Diocese of Detroit and as titular bishop of Cestrus. He received his episcopal consecration on January 26 1910, from Cardinal James Gibbons, with Bishops Henry Richter and Camillus Maes serving as co-consecrators. 

Kelly was a major contributor to the founding of Theta Phi Alpha, a national women's sorority at the University of Michigan in Ann Arbor.  He also supported the Foley Guild, the Catholic student association at the university.  He allowed the guild to have social events at St. Thomas Parish in Ann Arbor, although he banned tango dancing at parties there in 1914.

During World War I, Kelly served on the Michigan Library War Council, an organization that provided reading material to American soldiers from that state.  In 1918, he was appointed superintendent of the diocesan schools.  In 1920, Kelly and the other bishops in Michigan defeated a proposed amendment by nativist groups to the Michigan State Constitution that would have required all children between ages five and 16 to attend public schools.

Bishop of Grand Rapids 
On January 16, 1919, Pope Benedict XV named Kelly as the third bishop of the Diocese of Grand Rapids; he was installed on May 20, 1919.  

Edward Kelly died on March 26, 1926, at the episcopal residence in Grand Rapids, Michigan, from a hemorrhage or embolism. He was age 65.

References

People from Hartford, Michigan
1926 deaths
1860 births
St. Charles College alumni
Roman Catholic bishops of Grand Rapids
20th-century Roman Catholic bishops in the United States
Roman Catholic Archdiocese of Detroit
Theta Phi Alpha